Mayvan (also Romanized as Māīvān and Māyvān) is a village in Shah Jahan Rural District, in the Central District of Faruj County, North Khorasan Province, Iran. At the 2006 census, its population was about 4000.

References 

Populated places in Faruj County